Tarong may refer to:

 Tarong, Queensland
 Tarong Energy
 Tarong National Park
 Tarong North Power Station
 Tarong Power Station
 Tarong railway line